A demat account is an Indian term for a dematerialized account that holds financial securities (equity or debt) digitally and to trade shares in the share market. In India, demat accounts are maintained by two depository organizations: the National Securities Depository Limited and the Central Depository Services Limited. 

A depository participant (DP), such as a bank, acts as an intermediary between the investor and the depository. In India, a DP is described as an agent of the depository. The relationship between the DPs and the depository is governed by an agreement made between the two under the Depositories Act. The demat account number is quoted for all transactions to enable electronic settlements of trades to take place. Access to the dematerialized account requires an internet password and a transaction password which allows the transfers or purchases of securities. 

A security is a tradable financial asset; the term commonly refers to any form of a financial instrument, but its legal definition varies by jurisdiction. Purchases and sales of securities on the demat account are automatically made once transactions are confirmed and completed.

Types of demat accounts 
There are three types of demat accounts offered by depository participants:

 Regular demat accounts
 Repatriable demat accounts (allows foreign funds and transfers abroad)
 Non-repatriable demat accounts

Fees
There are four major charges usually levied on a demat account: account opening fee, annual maintenance fee, custodian fee and transaction fee. Charges for all fees vary by depository participant.

 Account-opening fee - There may not be an opening account fee. Private banks do not have one, but other entities do impose an opening fee.
 Maintenance fee - This is also known as folio maintenance charges, and is generally levied in advance. It is charged on an annual or monthly basis.
 Custodian fee - A fee for holding the securities.
 Transaction fee - A fee per transaction.

Documents required
Opening a demat account requires providing documents that fulfill the requirements of Know Your Customer.

References

External links
 Central Depository Services Limited website

Securities (finance)
Stock market
Financial services in India